Irina Andreevna Shorokhova (born 12 January 1997) is a Russian female badminton player.

Achievements

BWF International Challenge/Series
Women's Singles

Women's Doubles

 BWF International Challenge tournament
 BWF International Series tournament
 BWF Future Series tournament

References

External links
 
 Team Russia 2016

1997 births
Living people
Russian female badminton players
21st-century Russian women